Kildin Sámi (also sometimes known as Kola Sámi, Eastern Sámi, and Lappish, though all of these are ambiguous) is a Sámi language spoken on the Kola Peninsula of northwestern Russia that today is and historically was inhabited by this group.

The Sámi languages closest to Kildin are Ter Sámi and Akkala Sámi, in Soviet tradition sometimes considered to be dialects of Kildin Sámi. From a strictly geographical point of view, only Kildin and Ter, spoken on the Peninsula, could be regarded as Kola Sámi. It is the largest of the Eastern Sámi languages by number of speakers. Its future, however, appears to be not as bright as that of Skolt Sámi or Inari Sámi because the language is used actively by only very few people today.

Geographic distribution

Originally, Kildin Sámi was spoken in clustered areas of the mainland and coastal parts of the Kola Peninsula. Nowadays, Kildin Sámi speakers can be found in rural and urban areas, including the administrative center of the oblast. The area of Lovozero has the highest concentration of speakers. Other Kildin Sámi speakers are scattered throughout the villages and small towns of the Peninsula: Revda, Kola, Loparskaya, Teriberka, but can also be found in larger more sizable towns of Murmansk Oblast such as Olenegorsk and Apatity. Lovozero is known as the main place where the language is still spoken by 700–800 ethnic Sámi amongst a total village population of approximately 3,000. However, today the Saami are but a minority in Lovozero: the large majority of the population consists of Russians and Izhma Komi. The language has only about 100 active and perhaps 600 passive speakers. As a result of relocation, migration, and forced movement of the group, the community has really fragmented and become divided over other areas in Murmansk Region, thus leading to an inability for the revival and sustenance of their language, traditions, customs, and beliefs.

History

The early period 
The Kildin Sámi (Kola Sámi) first came into contact and had more subsequent meetings with the Russians in the 12th century, when Pomor traders from the republic of Novgorod landed on the southern shores of the Kola Peninsula. Russians themselves inhabited and set up shelters in the Kola and the Ter Coast as it was known then during the 13th–14th centuries. During the 15th and 16th centuries, Russians started heavily occupying and building their own communities in northern Karelia and increased exposure between the Kildin Sámi and Russians naturally blossomed as a result. In the 19th century, Kola Sámi were organized and advocated for themselves through "tight-knit familial communities" where they worked in pastures, lived by fishing, and survived through hunting all in a concrete set around defined territory with extended family. During this time, they community shared in spiritual customs and held similar ideologies on their language and community. In the Russian empire, the Kildin Sámi had no authority, rights or privileges, or liberties of autonomy and independence to control their affairs and to educate and teach their language through schools. After the 1917 Revolution which overthrew the tsarist regime of Nicholas II and led to the rise of the Bolsheviks, party systems, and emphasis towards a village-centered, peasant-centered, society, the Soviet state implemented laws or statutes that encouraged the development and protection of Sámi language and Sámi culture.

The Stalinist era 
During the 1930s, with an orientation toward Russian nationalism ("Russification") and Russian identity that came about more dramatically with Joseph Stalin's rise to power and his oppressive tactics, Kola Sámi languages and culture came under intense pressure. His oppressive agricultural, economic, and cultural policies also led to the arrest of those who resisted collectivization, including many who lived in the Kola tundras. As Russia entered World War II, Kildin Sámi youth were drafted and impressed to serve in the Red Army, which lessened hardships and prejudices they faced for a temporary period. Although the repression ended after the death of Stalin in 1953, Russification policies continued and the work with the Sámi languages started again only in the beginning of the 1980s when new teaching materials and dictionaries were published.

Current state
As social and cultural emphasis has been put on the writing and speaking of the various languages that constitute Russia, Kildin Sámi has now become a critically endangered language. Russian is prominently spoken in Kildin Sámi communities so much so that the original language is hardly ever heard of or only spoken privately amongst those who still know how to do so within an insular community. The few Kildin Sámi who speak and understand their language proficiently can also speak various dialectical tongues that constitute ethnic Russia. Because the language has eroded so rapidly over the centuries, it is more widely spoken amongst or between older elders who were taught and educated between themselves and thus retained the spoken language and hardly spoken by children. In Lovozero, Kilden Sámi was taught as an elective subject for first through fourth graders ; however, beginning in the 2014–15 school year, Kilden Sámi language instruction was folded into a broader class on Sámi history, culture, and folklore. The reasons for the loss and decline in speakership is as follows: a lack of education, dispersion of the Sámi, no generational transmission of traditional Sámi trades and ways of life, and not ever needing to speak or not regularly speaking the language have both caused speakership to take a hit over the years. Kildin Sámi is written using an official Cyrillic script.

Opportunities and challenges for the Kildin Sámi

Opportunities 
There is an opportunity to revitalize, reintegrate, and have Kildin Sámi be more widely spoken such as reintroducing and raising awareness and support for Kildin Sámi as an everyday language for communication—like in the Sámi community of Lovozero. Youth and adolescents are expressing more interest now to speak Kildin Sámi which can help in the languages survival. A sizable portion of political and cultural Kildin Sámi groups are pushing for policies and local measures that help to maintain and protect Sámi tradition, which is important if the language is to survive the test of time. The federal Russian legislation guarantees the Sámi several legal rights giving them language sovereignty and rights to use and develop their languages. But for the practical realization of these rights the Kola Sámi community needs to hold a constant constructive dialogue with the municipal and regional authorities, which have expressed their willingness to cooperate with the Sámi in the development of the Sámi language and culture.

Challenges 
A majority of children remain ignorant of their traditional languages, customs and beliefs, and have had no formal or informal teaching which may give them a base of knowledge from which to work from. Antiquated materials, ineffective or inaccessible resources, and old teaching methods are often used to teach the language; there is no efforts towards the transmission of the language to future generations nor is there an active effort to preserve written language for scholarly use or to build opportunities to learn Kildin Sámi at higher levels. Although authorities and some government officials express a desire and willingness to resuscitate and revitalize the language, the community is not using that to their advantage, either because they do not know how to do so or whom to reach out to. There is no collaboration or team effort from language activists, language experts and language users and no coordinated or organized process to make learning the Kildin Sámi language a reality for more people. A language center or another initiative to carry out a more coordinated and well-planned language work could solve that problem.

Literature
The printed item in Kildin were chapters 1-22 of the Gospel of Matthew published in 1897. It was translated with the help of native speaker consultants, in Cyrillic orthography by the Finnish linguist Arvid Genetz, and printed at the expense of the British and Foreign Bible Society.  (The rest of the Gospel was in Akkala Sámi language.)

Writing system

Kildin Sámi has been written in an extended version of Cyrillic since the 1980s. The alphabet has three variants with some minor differences among certain letters, mostly in Ҋ vs. Ј and ’ (apostrophe) vs. Һ. The Sammallahti/Khvorostukhina dictionary (1991) uses Ҋ and ’ (apostrophe); Antonova et al. (1985) uses Ј and Һ; a third orthographic variant, used by Kert (1986), has neither of these letters.

Note that the letters Ӓ, Ҋ/Ј, Һ/’ (apostrophe), Ӆ, Ӎ, Ӊ, Ӈ, Ҏ, Ъ, Ь, Ҍ and Ӭ do not occur in the word-initial position, either because the letters mark features of preceding consonants or the sounds they represent do not occur word initially. Therefore these letters do not normally occur in uppercase, except for all caps text.

The letter Щ occurs only in Russian loanwords.

The orthographic principles are more or less similar to Russian, but note the following special features.

Palatalization 
Similar to Russian, palatalization of a consonant in Kildin Sámi is marked by the letter Ь or one of the vowel letters Е, Ё, И, Ю, and Я following the consonant. Palatalized Д, Т, Н, however, are marked by ҍ or one of the vowel letters Ӓ and Ӭ. The consonant letter Н before Ь or one of the vowel letters Е, Ё, И, Ю, and Я does not represent palatalization but the palatal nasal .

Long vowels 
Long vowels are marked with a macron  over the vowel letter (and above the diaeresis in the cases of Ё).

Preaspiration 
The letter Һ occurs before the letters П, Т, К, Ц and Ч, and marks (historical) preaspiration.

Voiceless sonorants 
Voiceless sonorants are represented by the letters Ҋ/Ј, Ӆ, Ӎ, Ӊ, and Ҏ.

Velar nasal
The velar nasal is written as Ӈ.

Phonology
Below is one analysis of the consonants in Kildin Sámi as given by The Oxford Guide to the Uralic Languages:

 Geminates occur in all consonants except preaspirated.

The Oxford Guide to the Uralic Languages gives the following inventory of monophthongs:

Rimma Kuruch's dictionary presents a slightly different set of monophthongs:

Grammar

Nouns 

According to Kuruch, Kildin Sámi nouns are classified into several declensions.

Negation 
In Kildin Sámi negation is formed by a syntagma, which consists of a finite negative auxiliary and a finite main verb in a special case called connegative (negative form of the main verb). The negative auxiliary gets inflected by person, number and mood. The connegative is a case for the main verb in a negative clause. The tense (whether present or past) is marked by the main verb in a negative clause. The negative auxiliary has the same form in all tenses.

This is the inflectional paradigm of the negative auxiliary:

Negative clause in present tense:

Negative clause in present tense:

With the negation of the verb "to be" in the third person it comes to an amalgamation of the main verb and the negative auxiliary:
 ell'a = "is not", compound of ejj (3. pers. sg. negative auxiliary) and lea (connegative, present, main verb: "to be")
 jievla = "are not", compound of jiev (3. pers. pl. negative auxiliary) and lea (connegative, present, main verb: "to be")
 ell'ij = "was not", compound of ejj (3. pers. sg. negative auxiliary) and liijja (connegative, past, main verb: "to be")

In the third person plural of the past tense there is no amalgamation of the negative auxiliary and the main verb "to be":
 jiev liijja = "were not", compound of jiev (3. pers. pl. negative auxiliary) and liijja (connegative, past, main verb: "to be")

Negative indefinite pronouns are formed with the negative prefix ni-. It is the only prefix in Kildin Sámi and is borrowed from the Russian language. The prefix ni- can get used with all interrogative pronouns. The negative indefinite pronouns can stay in different cases. Some examples are:
 ni-k'ē Neg-who? nominative, singular "nobody"
 ni-k'ējn Neg-who? comitative, singular "with nobody"
 ni-k'ēnn Neg-who? genitive, singular "nobody's"
 ni-mī Neg-what? nominative, singular "nothing"
 ni-mēnn Neg-what? accusative, singular "nothing"

Loanwords to English 

The word tundra has been borrowed to English, via Russian.

See also
Nina Afanasyeva 
Georgy Martynovitch Kert

References

Antonova A.A., N.E. Afanas'eva, E.I. Mečkina, L.D. Jakovlev, B.A. Gluhov (ed. Rimma D. Kuruch). 1985. Саамско–русский словарь. Сāмь–рӯшш сāннҍнэххьк [Kildin Sámi–Russian Dictionary]. Murmansk, Soviet Union.
Kert, G.M. (1986). Словарь саамско-русский и русско-саамский [Dictionary Kildin Sámi–Russian and Russian–Kildin Sámi]. Leningrad, Soviet Union: Prosveshcheniye.
Kotcheva, Kristina & Michael Rießler. 2016. "Clausal Complementation in Kildin, North and Skolt Saami". In: Kasper Boye and Petar Kehayov (eds.), Complementizer Semantics in European Languages (Empirical Approaches to Language Typology, volume 57). Berlin: De Gruyter Mouton, pp. 499–528. 
Rießler, Michael. 2007. "Grammatical Borrowing in Kildin Saami". In: Matras von Yaron and Jeanette Sakel (eds.) Grammatical Borrowing in Cross-Linguistic Perspective (Empirical Approaches to Language Typology, volume 38). Berlin: De Gruyter Mouton, pp. 229–244. 
Sammallahti, P. and A. Khvorostukhina (1991). Unna sámi–сāмь sátnegirjjáš. Удць сāмь–sámi соагкнэгка [Small North Sámi–Kildin Sámi/Kildin Sámi–North Sámi Dictionary]. Ohcejohka, Finland: Girjegiisá Oy.

External links

Kildin Saami Vocabulary List (from the World Loanword Database)
 Алфавит саамского языка (кильдинский диалект)
 Антонова А. А., Э. Шеллер 2021: Саамско-русский и Русско-саамский словарь (около 16000 слов). Тромсё.
 Sámi–Russian dictionary, Kuruch R. D., a grammar of Kildin Sámi language (DJVU, PDF)
Kildin Saami language by Michael Rießler
Barnefestival med dystert bakteppe - Ingen barn eller unge på Kolahalvøya har kildinsamisk som sitt daglige språk. Festivalen «Eventyrbyen» skal få dem til å bruke samisk mer. [Festival for children, and a grim backdrop - No children or youths on the Kola peninsula, have Kildin Sámi as an everyday language. The festival "Eventyrbyen" is supposed to get them to increase their use of Sámi language.] (27 April 2021) NRK
Kildin Saami language by Jelena Porsanger

 
Sámi in Russia
Eastern Sámi languages
Languages of Russia
Murmansk Oblast
Cyrillic alphabets
Cyrillic-script orthographies